Gymnobela mitrodeta is a species of sea snail, a marine gastropod mollusk in the family Raphitomidae.

Description
The length of the shell attains 24.2 mm, its diameter 11.2 mm.

Distribution
This marine species occurs in the Banda Sea, at depths between 413 m - 436 m.

References

External links
 MNHN, Paris: holotype
 

mitrodeta
Gastropods described in 1997